Dugol-e Sara (also Romanized as Dūgol-e Sarā; also known as Dogol-e Sarā) is a village in Bibalan Rural District, Kelachay District, Rudsar County, Gilan Province, Iran. At the 2006 census, its population was 465, in 131 families.

References 

Populated places in Rudsar County